"Good Vibes" is a song by American country music singer Chris Janson. It is the lead single to his third studio album Real Friends. Janson co-wrote the song with Zach Crowell and Ashley Gorley, the former of whom also produced it.

History
Janson said that the idea came from an impromptu meeting with fellow songwriters Zach Crowell and Ashley Gorley, both of whom have written for him previously. He said that the idea came about after telling the other two writers "good vibes only", which inspired the song's central theme of positivity.

The song also features a music video, starring Janson's wife and children.

Commercial performance
"Good Vibes" reached No. 1 on Billboard Country Airplay on chart dated October 26, 2019. This is Janson's first No. 1 on the chart. The song has sold 77,000 copies in the United States as of December 2019.

Music video
The music video was directed by Michael Monaco and premiered on CMT, GAC and CMT Music in 2019.

Charts

Weekly charts

Year-end charts

Certifications

References

2019 songs
2019 singles
Chris Janson songs
Songs written by Chris Janson
Songs written by Zach Crowell
Songs written by Ashley Gorley
Warner Records Nashville singles